Nadan Vidošević (born 30 January 1960) is a Croatian politician, businessman and entrepreneur arrested on 12 November 2013, on the charge of misappropriating 32.9 million kunas (US$5,784.363) from Croatian Chamber of Commerce. He was a long-time member of the Croatian Democratic Union, before launching an independent and ultimately unsuccessful candidacy in the 2009–10 Croatian presidential election.

Overview
Vidošević graduated from the Split Faculty of Economy in 1984. He started his career at Dalmacijacement, a company producing construction materials, becoming the company's CEO in 1990.

In 1992, he became president of the Croatian football club Hajduk Split, a position he held for nearly 4 years. During that time, Hajduk managed to win 2 league titles, 1 cup and reach the UEFA Champions League quarter-finals in 1995 which was Hajduk's greatest achievement in modern-day Croatia. On the negative aspect, Ivan Buljan, Vedran Rožić and he were charged with tax evasion during their work in Hajduk for supposedly damaging it for 55 million kunas (7.3 million euros).

Following the 1993 Chamber of Counties election, he was elected to the now defunct Chamber of Counties of the Croatian Parliament on the Croatian Democratic Union ticket as a representative from Split-Dalmatia County. In October the same year, he was appointed Minister of Economy under prime minister Nikica Valentić, a position he held until 1995.

In 1995, he was elected chairman of the Croatian Chamber of Commerce, a position he held until 2013, after being re-elected four times: in 1999, 2003, 2007, and 2011.

Vidošević won 11.33 percent of the vote in the first round of the 2009 presidential election and was eliminated.

Vidošević was arrested on 12 November 2013, on the charge of misappropriating 32.9 million kunas (US$5,784.363) from Croatian Chamber of Commerce.

References

External links

 Nadan Vidosevic Arrested

|-

|-

|-

1960 births
Living people
Politicians from Split, Croatia
Businesspeople from Split, Croatia
Croatian sports executives and administrators
Croatian Democratic Union politicians
Economy ministers of Croatia
Candidates for President of Croatia
Presidents of the Croatian Football Federation